This is an incomplete list of listed buildings in Hadley.
Anyho
Fairholt, Hadley Green
Gate House and Gate, Monken Hadley
Grandon, Hadley Green
Hadley Cote & The Old Cottage
Hadley House, Hadley Green
Hadley Hurst
Hurst Cottage
Hollybush, Monken Hadley
Lemmons
Livingston Cottage and Monken Cottage
Mount House, Monken Hadley
Old Fold Manor Golf Club House
Ossulston House
Pagitts Almshouses
Pymlicoe House
The Chase, Hadley Common
White Lodge, Monken Hadley

References

Listed buildings in the London Borough of Barnet
Hadley
Monken Hadley